Riri Junian Nella (born 10 June 1996) is an Indonesian footballer who plays a defender for Asprov Jabar and the Indonesia women's national team.

Club career
Junian has played for Asprov Jabar in Indonesia.

International career 
Junian represented Indonesia at the 2022 AFC Women's Asian Cup qualification.

References

External links

1996 births
Living people
People from Bogor
Sportspeople from West Java
Indonesian women's footballers
Women's association football defenders
Indonesia women's international footballers
21st-century Indonesian women